Iepenloftspul Jorwert (Frisian for 'open air play Jorwert') is a yearly event during summertime in Jorwert, The Netherlands. The event is organised since 1954 to pay for the restoration of the tower of the local church that collapsed in 1951.  The play is performed in the garden of the local notary on several evenings in the end of August and the beginning of September.

Most of the translations into Frisian are by Jan Schotanus. Romke Toering has directed the plays for more than 30 years.  Since 2007, the plays are directed by Tjerk Kooistra.

Plays

References

External links 
 

Recurring events established in 1954
Culture in Leeuwarden
1954 establishments in the Netherlands